Zhang Yanmei (born October 26, 1970) is a female Chinese short track speed skater. She competed in the 1992 Winter Olympics and in the 1994 Winter Olympics.

Biography
Zhang was born in Shulan, Jilin, China. In 1992, she was a member of the Chinese relay team in the 3000 m relay competition. She also competed in the 500 m event.

Zhang won a silver medal in the 500 m competition, accusing gold medal winner Cathy Turner of the U.S. of grabbing her leg during the race before stalking off the ceremonial stand, taking her medal off, and flinging her flower bouquet to the ground.  Zhang in her protest was saying she felt Turner should have been disqualified for her move and she been awarded the gold medal.  This drew a mixed reaction from the fans, some who jeered her display of poor sportsmanship, and others who applauded her taking a stand against Turner's controversial skating style and win.

She also finished eighth in the 3000m relay event.

References

 

1972 births
Living people
Chinese female speed skaters
Chinese female short track speed skaters
Olympic short track speed skaters of China
Olympic silver medalists for China
Olympic medalists in short track speed skating
Short track speed skaters at the 1992 Winter Olympics
Short track speed skaters at the 1994 Winter Olympics
Medalists at the 1994 Winter Olympics
Asian Games medalists in short track speed skating
Short track speed skaters at the 1990 Asian Winter Games
Sportspeople from Jilin City
Medalists at the 1990 Asian Winter Games
Asian Games gold medalists for China
Asian Games silver medalists for China
People from Shulan
20th-century Chinese women
21st-century Chinese women